Bertha (died after 1014) was the wife of Arduin of Ivrea.  She was thus margravine of Ivrea and queen of Italy (1002-1014).

Her parentage is unknown, but she is often said to be identical with Bertha of Milan, who was a member of the Obertenghi dynasty. Other scholars suggest that Bertha may have been the daughter of Hubert of Tuscany or of Amadeus (son of Anscar II)

Bertha intervened in eight of Arduin's royal diplomas, in which she was often called his consors regni (royal consort).

With Arduin, Bertha had three sons:
Arduin (sometimes called Ardicino)
Otto
Guibert.

Notes

References
Die Urkunden Arduins, ed. H. Bresslau and R. Holtzmann, MGH Diplomata III (Hannover, 1900-1903), accessible online at: Monumenta Germaniae Historica
M. G. Bertolini, ‘Alberto Azzo,’ in Dizionario Biografico degli Italiani - Volume 1 (1960)
G. Arnaldi, ‘Arduino, re d’Italia’ in Dizionario Biografico degli Italiani – Volume 4 (1962)
C. Dionisotti, Le famiglie celebri medioevali dell' Italia superiore (Turin, 1887), accessible online at archive.org
D. Carutti, Il conte Umberto (Biancamano) e il re Ardoino. Ricerche e documenti (Rome, 1884, 2nd ed., first published 1878), accessible online at: archive.org

External links
Bertha, Königin von Italien

Italian queens consort
People from Lombardy
11th-century Italian nobility
11th-century Italian women
Year of birth unknown
Year of death unknown